Puntigrus pulcher is a species of cyprinid fish endemic to Borneo.  This species can grow to a length of  TL.

References 

Puntigrus
Freshwater fish of Indonesia
Fish described in 1922